Balanoff is a surname. Notable people with the surname include:

Clem Balanoff (born 1953), American politician, son of Miriam
Miriam Balanoff (1926–2017), American judge and politician
Tom Balanoff, American labor union leader